is a Japanese actress.

Career
Born in Kanagawa Prefecture, Makita made her acting debut at age 7. In 2012, she appeared in the TV drama Going My Home directed by Hirokazu Kore-eda and has since acted in his films After the Storm (2016), The Third Murder (2017), and Shoplifters (2018). She won the best newcomer award at the Hochi Film Award in 2018 for Shino Can't Say Her Name, directed by Hiroaki Yuasa. She then won the 2020 Mainichi Film Award for Best Supporting Actress as well as the Hochi Film Award for best supporting actress for her role as a pregnant teenager in Naomi Kawase's True Mothers, which was selected for the 2020 Cannes Film Festival. Her performance in the film garnered praise from such reviewers as those in The Guardian, the Los Angeles Times, The Hollywood Reporter, and the South China Morning Post.

Filmography

Film

Series

Stage

Music videos

Awards

References

External links

21st-century Japanese actresses
People from Kanagawa Prefecture
2002 births
Living people
Best Supporting Actress Asian Film Award winners